Lex van Berkel born in Tilburg, The Netherlands, better known as The Boy Next Door also known as TBND is a Dutch DJ and music producer. He gained fame through  "La Colegiala" with Fresh Coast featuring vocals of Jody Bernal, remake of the Walter León Aguilar hit. Also in 2017, he was featured as one of the promising DJs in the Dutch reality show The Next Icons. "La Colegiala" charted in the Netherlands and Sweden, shortly after which he signed a record deal with Spinnin' Records. His remake of Shakira's "Whenever, Wherever" as "Whenever" with Kris Kross Amsterdam featuring vocals of British singer Conor Maynard charted internationally and was certified platinum in the Netherlands.

Discography

Singles

References

External links
Official website

Dutch DJs
Living people
Musicians from Tilburg
Year of birth missing (living people)